Exalt or exaltation may refer to:

 Exaltation (astrology), a characteristic of a planet in astrology
 Exaltation (Mormonism), a belief in The Church of Jesus Christ of Latter-day Saints
 Exaltation of Christ or "Session of Christ", a Christian doctrine
 Exaltation of the Cross or "Feast of the Cross", an Orthodox Christian holiday
 Exaltation, in Freemasonry, the initiation ritual into the Holy Royal Arch degree
 Exaltation (sculpture)
 LG Exalt, a flip phone

See also 
 Exaltación (disambiguation)
 Exalted, a role-playing game produced by White Wolf
 Exalted (comics), a 2005–07 comic based on the game
 The Exalter (Ar-Rāfiʿ), in Islam, one of the 99 names of Allah
 The Exalted One, nickname of professional wrestler Brodie Lee